McElhaney is a surname. Notable people with the surname include:

Douglas L. McElhaney (born 1947), American diplomat
James W. McElhaney (1938–2017), American lawyer and academic
Lynette Gibson McElhaney, American politician
Ralph McElhaney (1870–1930), Scottish footballer